List of Hawaii Five-0 episodes may refer to:

List of Hawaii Five-O (1968 TV series) episodes, from the original 1968 TV series
List of Hawaii Five-0 (2010 TV series) episodes, from the 2010 reboot of the original series

List of Hawaii Five-0 episodes
Hawaii-related lists